Josimar de Carvalho Ferreira, also known as Josimar (born April 9, 1972, in Rio de Janeiro) is a retired Brazilian footballer.

Honours
 Campeonato Carioca in 1991, 1992 with São Cristóvão
 Campeonato Carioca in 1996, 2003 with Portuguesa
 Campeonato Carioca in 2005 with Nova Iguaçu

References

Josimar at Sambafoot

External links

1972 births
Brazilian footballers
Brazilian expatriate footballers
Association football forwards
Living people
Fluminense FC players
Bangu Atlético Clube players
America Football Club (RJ) players
Associação Atlética Portuguesa (RJ) players
Pohang Steelers players
K League 1 players
Coritiba Foot Ball Club players
Expatriate footballers in South Korea
Esporte Clube Democrata players
Madureira Esporte Clube players
Brazilian expatriate sportspeople in South Korea
Footballers from Rio de Janeiro (city)